Attraction is a 2018 Bulgarian romantic comedy film directed by Martin Makariev, and starring Yana Marinova, Alexander Sano, Luiza Grigorova, Radina Borshosh, Koyna Ruseva, Vlado Penev, Bashar Rahal, Zhivko Simeonov and Mihail Nedyalkov. The screenplay was written by Marinova, Borislav Zahariev, Georgi Angelov and Alexander Chobanov, while Marinova is the co-producer of the film with Rahal.

Attraction is filmed in October 2017 and was released theatrically in February 23, 2018.

Cast 
 Yana Marinova as Lora Angelova
 Alexander Sano as Kalin Sokolov
 Luiza Grigorova-Makariev as Diana Borisova
 Koyna Ruseva as Irena Velikova
 Bashar Rahal as Velikov
 Radina Borshosh as Sonya
 Zhivko Simeonov as Vasil
 Mihail Nedyalkov as 'The Trombone'
 Chloe Rahal as Mimi
 Spartak Todorov as Bobo
 Vasil Iliev as Kiro
 Anastassia Levordashka as Nina
 Vladimir Tsvetanov as Zhelev
 Nadya Keranova as Nikol
 Vladimir Penev as Stoev, the principal
 Zhivko Sirakov as Sasho
 Karla Rahal as Radinova
 Nikoleta Lozanova as the mother of 'The Trombone'
 Vasko Ivanov - Dexter as the DJ
 Marko Marinovich as the rapper
 Kaloyan Paterkov as Bogdanov
 Harry Rangelov as the waiter

References

External links
 

2018 films
Bulgarian comedy films
2010s Bulgarian-language films
2018 drama films